Gibberula angelarum is a species of sea snail, a marine gastropod mollusk, in the family Cystiscidae.

Distribution
This species occurs in Oman.

References

angelarum
Gastropods described in 2018